The concept of Social Identity Complexity (Roccas and Brewer, 2002) is a theoretical construct that refers to an individual's subjective representation of the interrelationships among his or her multiple group identities. 

Social identity complexity reflects the degree of overlap perceived to exist between groups of which a person is simultaneously a member. 

Roccas and Brewer report that membership in many different groups (multiple social identities) can lead to greater social identity complexity, which can foster the development of superordinate social identities and global identity, making international identity more likely in individualist cultures (see Tajfel & Turner [1986] for a review of social identity theory).

Social identity complexity may be a crucial factor to consider in applying social psychological models of bias reduction.

Poetics – like coolitude or creolization – have used the rhizome to refer to multiple identities.

References
 Roccas, S. & Brewer M. B. (2002).  Social identity complexity.  Personality and Social Psychology Review, 6, 88 - 106. doi:10.1207/S15327957PSPR0602_01
 Tajfel, H. & Turner, J. C. (1986). The social identity theory of inter-group behavior. In S. Worchel & W. G. Austin (Eds.) Psychology of intergroup relations (2nd ed., 7 - 24). Chicago, IL: Nelson Hall.
 Miller, K. & Brewer, M. B. & Arbuckle, N. L. (2009) Social Identity Complexity: Its Correlates and Antecedents. Group Processes & Intergroup Relations, (2009 Vol 12, 79–94). Los Angeles, London, New Delhi, Singapore and Washington DC: SAGE Publications.

Collective identity